John Doehring (November 6, 1909November 18, 1972) was an American football halfback/fullback in the National Football League. Despite never playing in college, he played professionally for the Chicago Bears (1932–1934, 1936–1937) and the Pittsburgh Pirates (1935).

See also
List of Chicago Bears players
List of Pittsburgh Steelers players

References

1909 births
1972 deaths
Players of American football from Milwaukee
American football halfbacks
American football fullbacks
Chicago Bears players
Pittsburgh Pirates (football) players